Ziarat (also Romanized as Zīārat; also known as Zeyārat-e Khāşeh Rūd, Ziār, Zīārat-e Khāşeh Rūd, Zīārat-e Khāsteh Rūd, and Zīyārat Khāseh Rūd) is a village in the Central District of Gorgan County, Golestan Province, Iran. At the 2006 census its population was 1,964, in 478 families.

Ziarat is located about 8 km south of Gorgan, in the Golestan Province of Iran. The Arabic word 'ziarat' (زيارة), meaning "visit", is used in Persian to refer to (pilgrimage to) a holy place.

Ziarat lies in a valley inside the eastern part of the Caspian Hyrcanian rain forests. There are three mosques in the village and near the shrine is a hot spring that feeds a public bath before joining the valley river. Some of the surrounding hills are grazed by sheep, goats and cattle. South of the village, at the end of a dirt road, is a water fall that is a popular tourist attraction.

References

External links 

 "News article on www.payvand.com" with links to photos.

Populated places in Gorgan County